Murod Khanturaev (4 July 1987 – 19 July 2021), was an Uzbek mixed martial artist. Prior to his death, he served as Vice President of the MMA Federation of Uzbekistan.

Biography 
Murod Khanturaev was born on July 4, 1987, in TuranLT in a middle-class family. He was grateful to them for a happy childhood and for the fact that the family did not need anything.

At the age of seventeen, Murod Khanturaev was honored to become the champion of Asia in universal combat among adults. This victory for the fighter was extremely important, after he met a man, and later this man turned out to be his coach. In 2013 he held his professional fight. He was the vice-president of the MMA Federation of Uzbekistan.

Mixed martial arts record 
Murod Khanturaev's Mixed Martial Arts record.

Death 
On July 19, 2021, information appeared on the network that the vice-president of MMA of Uzbekistan, fighter Murod Khanturaev, crashed to death in a car accident near Tashkent.

References 

1987 births
2021 deaths
Uzbekistani male mixed martial artists